The 1999 French Open girls' singles was a tennis tournament that took place on the outdoor clay courts at the Stade Roland Garros in Paris, France.

Nadia Petrova was the defending champion, but did not compete. 

Lourdes Domínguez Lino won the title defeating Stéphanie Foretz in the final, 6–4, 6–4.

Draw

Finals

Top half

Section 1

Section 2

Bottom half

Section 3

Section 4

Sources
Main Draw

Girls' Singles
French Open, 1999 Girls' Singles